Sainsbury may refer to:

People
 Sainsbury (surname)
 Sainsbury family, in British business and philanthropy

Business 
 Sainsbury's, British business centred on supermarket chain, founded by the Sainsbury family

See also
 Harry Arthur Saintsbury (1869–1939), English actor
 Sansbury, a surname